Aherlow GAA is a Gaelic Athletic Association club located in County Tipperary in Ireland, established in 1885, within a year of the GAA's foundation. The club plays Gaelic football at senior (in a combination with a neighbouring club), under-21, junior, minor and underage levels in the West Tipperary Division and all-county competitions of Tipperary GAA. The club also fields hurling teams, and plays Ladies' Gaelic football. The club is centred on the village of Lisvernane and surrounding Glen of Aherlow, approximately eight miles east of Tipperary town. Club players, who have played for the Tipperary senior football team, have included Ciarán McDonald and Barry Grogan. The club has joined forces with the intermediate football team Lattin-Cullen GAA for the senior football championship. This combination team, known as Aherlow Gaels, won the 2016 West Tipperary divisional title by defeating Galtee Rovers.

Gaelic football
The club's first county title was won at under-21 level in 1992. Footage of the match reputedly became "Ireland's first viral sensation" due to the "colourful commentary" in the recording. Described in a 2021 Irish Examiner article as "probably the most-watched club match in GAA history", copies and recreations of the recording were shown in Irish pubs "all over the world".

At senior level, the club has been Tipperary Senior Football champions on two occasions. They won their first county title in 2006 and went on to win their second title in November 2010 after a 2-4 to 1-6 win against Loughmore-Castleiney in the final at Semple Stadium.

Honours
Tipperary Senior Football Championship (2): 2006, 2010
West Tipperary Senior Football Championship (8): 1968 (as St. Ailbie's with Emly), 1997, 2005, 2006, 2007, 2009, 2010, 2016 (as Aherlow Gaels with Lattin-Cullen) 2021. 
 Tipperary Intermediate Football Championship (1): 1995
 West Tipperary Intermediate Football Championship (5): 1978, 1980, 1992, 1994, 1995
 Tipperary Under-21 Football Championship (3):  1992, 1995, 1996
 West Tipperary Under-21 Football Championship (11): 1960 (with Emly), 1991, 1992, 1993, 1995, 1996, 1997, 2006, 2007, 2008, 2014 (with Lattin-Cullen) 
 Tipperary Under-21 C Football Championship (1): 2003
 Tipperary Minor A Football Championship (1): 1994
 Tipperary Minor B Football Championship (2): 1988, 1989
 Tipperary Minor C Football Championship (1): 2002

Notable players
Barry Grogan
Ciarán McDonald

Ladies' Gaelic football
Aherlow Ladies had their most successful year to date in 2011, winning county and provincial titles and reaching the All-Ireland final.

Honours
All-Ireland Junior Ladies' Club Football Championship (0): (runners-up in 2011)
Munster Junior Ladies' Club Football Championship (1): 2011
Tipperary Ladies' Football Championship (1): 2011
Tipperary Ladies Senior Football Championship (2): 2019 2021

Hurling
Although Aherlow was long a mainly-football club, since the 1990s, the club has had some successes in hurling. It won the county Junior Championship in 2009, and the Intermediate title in 2011.

Honours
Tipperary Intermediate Hurling Championship (1): 2011
Tipperary Junior Hurling Championship (1): 2009
 Tipperary Under-21 B Hurling Championship (3): 1990 (with Sean Treacy's), 1992, 2009
 West Tipperary Under-21 B Hurling Championship (4): 1990 (with Sean Treacy's), 1992, 1996, 2009

References

External links
Aherlow GAA website (archived 2011)
Tipperary GAA website

Gaelic games clubs in County Tipperary
Hurling clubs in County Tipperary
Gaelic football clubs in County Tipperary